The collagen gel contraction assay is a type of wound contraction. It is performed using the dermal equivalent model, which consists of dermal fibroblasts seeded into a collagen gel.

References 

Skin physiology